Zinc finger protein 238 (also known as RP58 or ZBTB18) is a zinc finger containing transcription factor that in humans is encoded by the ZNF238 gene.

Function 
ZNF238 is a gene that plays a major role in the "promotion of ordered and correctly timed neurogenesis leading to proper layer formation and cortical growth." The loss of ZNF238 has been observed to cause microcephaly, agenesis of the corpus callosum, malformation of layers in the cerebral cortex, and cerebellar hypoplasia. Additionally, its absence can cause a decrease in Ngn2 and Neurod1 (in progenitor cells, and an increase thereof in mutant neurons), with the result of less progenitor cells and an increase in neuronal differentiation and glial cell growth. ZNF238 also regulates repressed genes that, if left unchecked, can lead to glioma progression. Furthermore, an absence of ZNF238 results in upregulation of the epithelial-mesenchymal transition process.

In tumors such as medulloblastomas, the loss of ZNF238 can disorganize the tumor's cellular divisional processes, resulting in a cellularly diverse neoplasm. This new diversity has been observed to increase the invasiveness of the tumor, yielding proliferation into more areas of the brain than before the loss of ZNF238.

C2H2-type zinc finger proteins, such as ZNF238, act on the molecular level as transcriptional activators or repressors and are involved in chromatin assembly.

Interactions 

ZNF238 has been shown to interact with DNMT3A.

References

Further reading

External links 
 

Transcription factors